Hashomer ("The Watchman") was a Jewish defense organization in Palestine founded in April 1909. It was an outgrowth of the Bar-Giora group and was disbanded after the founding of the Haganah in 1920. Hashomer was responsible for guarding Jewish settlements in the Yishuv, freeing Jewish communities from dependence upon foreign consulates and Arab watchmen for their security. It was headed by a committee of three—Israel Shochat, Israel Giladi, and Mendel Portugali.

History 

Hashomer was originated by Socialist Zionists, mostly members of Poale Zion, including Israel Shochat, Manya Shochat, Yehezkel Henkin, Yitzhak Ben-Zvi and Ben-Zvi's wife Rachel Yanait, several of whom had earlier formed a small secret guard society called Bar-Giora, which guarded the Sejera commune (now Ilaniya) and Mes'ha (now Kfar Tavor). Bar-Giora was founded on September 29, 1907 by Israel Shochat, Alexander Zaïd, Yehezkel Henkin in the apartment of Yitzhak Ben-Zvi which was in Jaffa. Less than two years later, on April 12, 1909 the Bar-Giora leadership decided at a meeting in Kfar Tavor to disband their organization and create a larger one, Hashomer. While earlier settlers had undertaken to defend their lands and communities, Hashomer was the first attempt to provide an organized defence for all the Jewish communities in Palestine. By 1910 Yehezkel Henkin was the first of the Shomer people to ride horseback so he became a riding guard.  He taught other “Watchmen” how to ride. This prompted the committee to buy him a horse that he named "Tzipora".
  
A serious obstacle was the lack of funds with which to buy arms. On Yehoshua Hankin's advice, they asked Eliahu Krause, the manager at Sejera, to lend them the money. The first guns were bought, several of the members refusing to part from them even for a moment.

They adopted local dress, and many of the customs of the Bedouins, Druze and Circassians. They also drew inspiration from the history of the Cossacks. The first few shomrim (guards), worked on foot, but soon acquired horses, which vastly increased their effectiveness. Mendel Portugali laid down the rules of engagement.

You do not seek an encounter with the thief; you chase him off, and only when you have no choice do you shoot. After all, he is out to steal a bag of grain, not to murder you, so don't murder him, drive him off. Don't sleep at night. If you hear footsteps, fire into the distance. If you feel he is a few steps away and you can fire without him falling upon you, fire into the distance. Only if your life is in danger—fire.

Guns used were the same as the locals', which included the 'jift', a single, or double-barrelled shotgun, the 'yunani' and 'osmanli' single-shot muskets, various rifles and Mauser pistols. Modern rifles, known as 'Abu-Hamsa' (father of five), were the most prestigious, and were prone to theft by the locals. The 'shibriyeh' (Arab dagger) and 'nabut' (club or mace) were carried by all. Ammunition was expensive and hard to come by, so primitive production centers were set up.

By 1912, Hashomer was guarding fourteen Jewish settlements. In addition to guarding settlements, Hashomer secretly began developing offensive capabilities, seeing itself as the nucleus of a future Jewish army. It raided Arab villages to beat or kill residents who had harmed Jews. In June 1916, it assassinated Aref al-Arsan, a Bedouin policeman who had tortured Jewish prisoners.
 
Hashomer was successful in providing defense for settlements throughout the country; though it sometimes aroused the ire of Arab watchmen, who lost their jobs, and of pilferers, and antagonized the Arab population by retaliatory raids. Some of the older settlers were also worried that Hashomer might upset the status-quo with the local population. During World War I many of its members were exiled to Anatolia by the Ottoman government because they were enemy (Russian) nationals. Several were hanged. When the Turks caught Yosef Lishanski of the Nili group, he told all he knew, implicating twelve members of Hashomer. The group nonetheless survived.
 
In 1920 it was decided to organize the Haganah, a much broader-based group, to cope with new defense challenges and needs of the growing Jewish community in Palestine. Many members of Hashomer joined the Jewish Legion, while others joined the mounted police, and played a prominent part in the defense of Tel Hai and Jerusalem during the Arab riots in 1920 and 1921. In June 1920 HaShomer ceased to exist as a separate body. Its members, however, maintained contact and made an important contribution to the Yishuv's defense. The Haganah itself became the core of the Israel Defense Forces (IDF).
 
In addition to their role as watchmen of the Jewish settlements in the country, members of Hashomer established a number of settlements of their own, including Tel Adash, Tel Hai, and Kfar Giladi.

During its ten years existence Hashomer had at most 100 members, 23 of them women. Most of them came from a small number of families who believed they were on the verge of becoming the leaders of Palestine's Jews.

Professor , Dean of Humanities at the University of Haifa, described the Hashomer as "...illiterate people, chauvinist. They spoke Yiddish and not Hebrew. Even a poor Yiddish, they curse a lot. They were people I wouldn't like to meet in a boulevard at midnight."

Gallery

Notable members 
Israel Shochat
Manya Shochat
Yitzhak Ben-Zvi
Alexander Zaïd
Mendel Portugali
Israel Giladi
Eliyahu Golomb
Yaacov Pat

See also
Jewish Supernumerary Police
Jewish Settlement Police

References

External links

Jewish Virtual Library: Hashomer
Alexander and Zipporah Zaid Collection - Hashomer on the Digital collections of Younes and Soraya Nazarian Library, University of Haifa

Jews and Judaism in Ottoman Palestine
Militant Zionist groups
Military units and formations established in 1909
Military units and formations disestablished in 1920
Zionist organizations
1909 establishments in the Ottoman Empire